David Marek Frölund (born 4 June 1979) is a Swedish former footballer who played as a right back, and occasionally as a midfielder. He started his youth career at Backa IF.

Until 2009 was known with the name David Marek, changing it to Frölund.

References

External links 

 

1979 births
Living people
Swedish footballers
Allsvenskan players
Superettan players
Örgryte IS players
BK Häcken players
Hisingsbacka FC players
Ljungskile SK players
Sweden international footballers
Association football midfielders